The John Humphrey Plummer Professorships were established in 1931 from a bequest of £200,000 under the will of John Humphrey Plummer, an estate agent of Southport, to the University of Cambridge for the advancement of science. The fund has been used to endow a series of professorships in various scientific fields under a number of titles.

John Humphrey Plummer Professors

Colloidal Physics
1930–1931 Sir Eric Rideal

Colloid Science
1931–1946 Sir Eric Rideal
1947–1966 Francis Roughton

Mathematical Physics
1932–1944 Sir Ralph H. Fowler
1946–1958 Douglas Hartree

Theoretical Chemistry
1932–1953 Sir John Lennard-Jones (elected Principal of the University College of North Staffordshire, later Keele University, in 1953)
1954–1967 Christopher Longuet-Higgins

Physics
1960–1971 Sir Brian Pippard (elected Cavendish Professor of Physics in 1971)
1972–1984 Sir Sam Edwards

Biophysics
1970–1981 Sir Alan Hodgkin (awarded the Nobel Prize in Physiology or Medicine in 1963)

Applied Numerical Analysis
1976–2001 Michael J. D. Powell

Cell Biology
1983–2002 Sir John Gurdon (awarded the Nobel Prize in Physiology or Medicine in 2012)

Magnetic Resonance
1987–1999 Ray Freeman

Theoretical Physics
1993–2009 Michael Green (elected Lucasian Professor of Mathematics in 2009)

Developmental Biology
2001–2008 Sir Jim Cuthbert Smith

Chemical and Structural Biology
2001–2017 Sir Chris Dobson (elected Master of St John's College in 2007)

Physics of Materials
2004–2014 Ullrich Steiner

Machine Learning, Artificial Intelligence, and Medicine
2018–present Mihaela van der Schaar

References

Plummer, John Humphrey
Faculty of Physics and Chemistry, University of Cambridge
Plummer, John Humphrey
1931 establishments in England